is a Japanese footballer who plays for Tokyo 23 FC as a striker.

Club career

Albirex Niigata (S)
Yoshikatsu Hiraga  signed for Albirex Niigata Singapore FC after graduating from Momoyama Gakuin University.

Career statistics

Club

References

1997 births
Living people
Association football forwards
Japanese footballers
Japanese expatriate footballers
Expatriate footballers in Singapore
Japanese expatriate sportspeople in Singapore
Momoyama Gakuin University alumni
Albirex Niigata Singapore FC players
Tokyo 23 FC players
Singapore Premier League players
Sportspeople from Osaka